Lazy Days is a 1929 Our Gang short comedy film directed by Robert F. McGowan. Produced by Hal Roach and released to theaters by Metro-Goldwyn-Mayer, it was the 89th Our Gang short to be released.

Synopsis
A lethargic Farina lounges about, waited upon by his girlfriend Trellis and half-minding his baby brother. Meanwhile, the rest of the gang are preparing their younger brothers and sisters for entry in a baby contest - including Joe's unsubtle attempt to pass off eleven-year-old Chubby as an infant - with the prize being $50.00. When Farina learns about the contest, he slowly begins bathing and dressing his younger brother. Later, while on the way to the contest, Farina has a mishap with the stroller. After giving up and laying down to rest, he learns from Joe that there was no prize since the contest was actually held over a month ago.

Cast

The Gang
 Joe Cobb as Joe
 Jean Darling as Jean
 Allen Hoskins as Farina
 Bobby Hutchins as Wheezer
 Mary Ann Jackson as Mary Ann
 Harry Spear as Harry
 Pete the Pup as himself

Additional cast
 Junior Allen as Thermos/Junior, Farina's brother
 Jannie Hoskins as Trellis, Farina's girlfriend

Note
Farina's younger sister Jannie, who had appeared in several of the silent Our Gang films, appears in this film as Farina's girlfriend, Trellis. This was the first of only two appearances she made in sound films of the Our Gang series (the other Teacher's Beau).
Lazy Days was one of several Our Gang films deleted from King World's Little Rascals television package in 1971 because of material considered racially offensive or insensitive. Because of its depiction of young African-American Farina as stereotypically—and exaggeratedly—lazy, the short has been withheld from television since the 1970s, although it has been released on home video. Although the film is still under copyright, it sometimes turns up in mutilated form on bootleg/public domain home video releases.

See also
 Our Gang filmography

References

External links

1929 films
American black-and-white films
Films directed by Robert F. McGowan
Hal Roach Studios short films
1929 comedy films
Our Gang films
1929 short films
1920s American films